Dipyrocetyl is a pharmaceutical drug used as an analgesic and antipyretic.

References

Antipyretics
Acetate esters
Benzoic acids
Analgesics